Syed Khalid Wazir (27 April 1936 – 27 June 2020) was a Pakistani cricketer who played in two Test matches in 1954.

He was selected for the 1954 tour of England after just two first-class matches in which he had made 18 runs and taken 5 wickets. In 16 first-class matches on the tour he made 253 runs at 16.86 as a middle-order batsman and took 9 wickets at 54.90. He played in the first and third Tests, batting in the lower order and not bowling. He played no more first-class cricket after the tour, and is thus the only Test cricketer whose first-class career ended before he turned 19.

He played one match as a professional for East Lancashire in the Lancashire League in 1957, taking 5 for 57.

Early education and family
He was educated at the St. Patrick's High School, Karachi.

His father Wazir Ali played Test cricket for India in the 1930s.

References

External links
 Khalid Wazir at Cricinfo

1936 births
2020 deaths
Pakistani cricketers
Khalid Wazir
Cricketers from Jalandhar
St. Patrick's High School, Karachi alumni